Augusta Salling (born 1954) is a former finance minister of Greenland. She began as a teacher. Her political roles before finance minister included being a member of a Parliament and mayor of Qeqertarsuaq from 1993 to 1997. In 2003 she refused to step down over a budgeting error she stated was not her fault. This led to the collapse of the governing coalition. She is a member of Feeling of Community.

References 

Finance ministers of Greenland
Greenlandic Inuit people
1954 births
Living people
Atassut politicians
Government ministers of Greenland
Mayors of places in Greenland
Greenlandic women in politics
Female finance ministers
Women mayors of places in Greenland
Women mayors of places in Denmark
20th-century Greenlandic politicians
20th-century women politicians
21st-century Greenlandic politicians
21st-century women politicians